Brachirus is a genus of small and medium-sized soles. Most are native to marine and brackish waters in the Indo-Pacific, but several species can also be seen freshwater in southern Asia, Eastern Africa, New Guinea and Australia.

Species
There are currently 18 recognized species in this genus:
 Brachirus aenea (H. M. Smith, 1931)
 Brachirus annularis Fowler, 1934 (Annular sole)
 Brachirus aspilos (Bleeker, 1852)
 Brachirus dicholepis (W. K. H. Peters, 1877)
 Brachirus elongatus (Pellegrin & Chevey, 1940) (Mekong blind sole)
 Brachirus harmandi (Sauvage, 1878)
 Brachirus heterolepis (Bleeker, 1856)
 Brachirus macrolepis (Bleeker, 1858)
 Brachirus niger (W. J. Macleay, 1880) (Black sole)
 Brachirus orientalis (Bloch & J. G. Schneider, 1801) (Oriental sole)
 Brachirus pan (F. Hamilton, 1822) (Pan sole)
 Brachirus panoides (Bleeker, 1851)
 Brachirus selheimi (W. J. Macleay, 1882) (Selheim's sole)
 Brachirus siamensis (Sauvage, 1878)
 Brachirus sorsogonensis (Evermann & Seale, 1907) (One-eyed sole)
 Brachirus swinhonis (Steindachner, 1867)
 Brachirus villosus (M. C. W. Weber, 1907) (Velvety sole)

References

Soleidae
Ray-finned fish genera
Taxa named by William John Swainson